The Midlands Prison is a medium security prison in Portlaoise, County Laois. It receives prisoners who are aged 17 years and over. It has a bed capacity of 870 and its daily average number of inmates resident in 2009 was 512.

History

The Midlands Prison was built adjacent to Portlaoise Prison with which it shares some facilities. It was built as a public-private partnership at a cost of £46 million (Irish punts). It opened in 2000. It is a committal prison as all prisoners resident have been transferred from other prisons. A very small number of prisoners in the resident population are awaiting trial but the vast majority of prisoners have already been sentenced. It receives prisoners from Carlow, Kildare, Kilkenny, Laois, Offaly and Westmeath. As of 2014 they are holding 800 prisoners.

See also

 Prisons in Ireland
 Portlaoise Prison

Notes

Buildings and structures in Portlaoise
Prisons in the Republic of Ireland